Edmund Patrick Cahill (born January 15, 1978) is an American actor known for portraying "Miracle on Ice" goalie Jim Craig in the 2004 film Miracle, and for playing the roles of Tag Jones in Friends and Detective Don Flack in CSI: NY. He has had numerous roles in television, films, and theater. His most recent starring role was in 2016 as District Attorney Conner Wallace in Conviction.

Early life
Cahill was born in New York City, New York. He is the middle of three children with an older and a younger sister. He is of Irish descent from his father, a stockbroker, and of Italian descent from his mother, an elementary school teacher.

Cahill graduated from Byram Hills High School in Armonk, New York in 1996. He attended Skidmore College in Saratoga Springs, New York and the Atlantic Theater Acting School, part of the New York University Tisch School of the Arts.

Career
In 2000 Cahill performed in Nicky Silver's Off-Broadway production of The Altruists. He was noticed by Sarah Jessica Parker and shortly after he made several television guest-star appearances including Sex and the City, Felicity, and Law & Order: Special Victims Unit. Cahill was also a recurring guest-star in the NBC sitcom Friends as Rachel's young assistant and boyfriend, Tag Jones. In 2002, he starred in a short-lived WB drama, Glory Days.

In the 2004 hockey movie Miracle, Cahill had the chance to play his boyhood hero, goalie Jim Craig. He had never played the goaltender position prior to the movie, so most of the game-action sequences of Craig were filmed with former NHL goalie Bill Ranford doubling for Cahill, although Cahill did shoot several key sequences from within goal.

When CBS decided in 2004 to create a third CSI series, CSI: NY, to add to its franchise, Cahill was hired to play the cocky, snarky homicide detective, Don Flack, who backs up the team of CSIs and who gets some of the best lines. The show ran for nine seasons and he was in all 197 episodes.

Cahill went back to the Atlantic Theater Company in June 2011 and performed at the conclusion of their 25th Anniversary season. He was in Tom Donaghy's one-act play, I Need a Quote, about "a hilarious telephone conversation between a single mother and a home insurance salesman."

In the summer of 2012 Cahill performed in David Adjmi's play, 3C, at the Rattlestick Playwrights Theater in New York City. He played "annoying neighbor Terry, a swinging bachelor true to the era, who unlike everyone else in this play, has no deep feelings at all."

In 2014 Cahill was cast as a main character starting in the second season of the CBS summer drama Under the Dome. He played Sam Verdreaux, a former EMT and reclusive brother-in-law to "Big Jim" Rennie. The series was canceled after three seasons.

Cahill was cast as the male lead in the 2016 ABC legal drama Conviction. He played New York County District Attorney Conner Wallace, who creates the Conviction Integrity Unit, which is set up to re-examine cases where there is a credible suspicion of wrongful conviction. The series was canceled after one season.

In 2019 Cahill played a charismatic criminal in a three-part story arc in CBS's NCIS: New Orleans. Among other crimes he was involved in the death of NCIS Special Agent Christopher Lasalle. In this series, he reunited with his former CSI: NY co-star, Vanessa Ferlito.

Personal life
Cahill married his longtime girlfriend Nikki Uberti in Los Angeles on July 12, 2009. Uberti is a makeup artist, former model, and ex-wife of photographer Terry Richardson. The couple have a son born in 2009.

On his right shoulder Cahill has a tattoo of his wife's name in a heart with an arrow through it and a swallow on top.

Cahill is an avid New York Rangers hockey fan and wrote an NHL Celeb Blog for three seasons.

Filmography

References

External links

Eddie Cahill at the Internet Off-Broadway Database

1978 births
20th-century American male actors
21st-century American male actors
American male film actors
American male stage actors
American male television actors
American male video game actors
American people of Irish descent
American people of Italian descent
Living people
Male actors from New York City
People from Armonk, New York
Skidmore College alumni
Tisch School of the Arts alumni